ESPN College Football Friday Primetime is a live game presentation of Division I-FBS college football on ESPN or sometimes ESPN2 and ESPNU. On the Friday after Thanksgiving, games air on ABC. There is no main sponsor. The game telecast airs every Friday night during the college football regular season. In 2022, the games will be announced by Roy Philpott and Andre Ware with Paul Carcaterra as the sideline reporter. The game is generally preceded by College Football Scoreboard with Matt Barrie, Jesse Palmer and Joey Galloway. They also present the halftime report.

Since debuting in 2004, it has broadcast games from numerous conferences including the Pac-12, ACC, Big Ten and the American.

The biggest game for this package occurred on September 28, 2007, when the at the time fifth-ranked West Virginia Mountaineers took on the eighteenth-ranked South Florida Bulls. The game drew a 2.7 rating.

2021 Season Ratings

Regular Season Most Watched Games
Games in this table may include those that aired the day after Thanksgiving. Unlike most Friday games, these games air in the afternoon and tend to feature better teams and thus better ratings. These games also may not air under the ESPN College Football Friday Primetime branding.

By year

Game features
 Starting Lineups: The starting lineups are presented during the first possession of each team's offense and defense.
 Impact Players: Following the starting lineups, McDonough and Spielman run down the top two or three impact players on each teams side of the ball.
 Halftime Report: The crew of Chris Cotter, Lou Holtz and Mark May present the halftime report, which features analysis of the first half, highlights of earlier games and a look at other happenings in the sports world.
 SportsCenter In-game: This segment appears during various time in the game, and gives up to the minute highlights when something big happens in another game.

See also
 College GameDay
 College Football Scoreboard
 College Football Final
 ABC Saturday Night College Football

References

2004 American television series debuts
2010s American television series
ESPN2 original programming
American sports television series
Friday